Flood is the second live album, and sixteenth album overall, by American jazz pianist and keyboardist Herbie Hancock. Recorded live in Tokyo, the album was originally released exclusively in Japan in 1975 as a double LP , reads kōzui meaning flood. It features The Headhunters (saxophonist Bennie Maupin, bass guitarist Paul Jackson, percussionist Bill Summers and drummer Mike Clark, along with guitarist DeWayne McKnight) performing selections from the albums Maiden Voyage (track 1), Head Hunters (tracks 4 and 6), Thrust (tracks 2, 3, and 5), and Man-Child (track 7)–– with the latter album still two months away from release at the time of these concerts.

Flood remained a Japanese-only release in all formats until a 2014 CD reissue in the U.S. by the Wounded Bird label.

The cover artwork was designed by Nobuyuki Nakanishi.

Track listing
All compositions by Herbie Hancock except where noted.

Personnel
Herbie Hancock – acoustic piano, Fender Rhodes, clavinet, ARP Odyssey, ARP Soloist, ARP String Ensemble
Bennie Maupin – soprano saxophone, tenor saxophone, saxello, bass clarinet, flute, percussion
DeWayne "Blackbyrd" McKnight – guitar
Paul Jackson – Fender bass
Mike Clark – drum set
Bill Summers – congas, percussion

References

Herbie Hancock live albums
1975 live albums
Albums produced by Dave Rubinson
Live jazz-funk albums
Albums recorded at Nakano Sun Plaza
Jazz fusion albums by American artists